Joseph Chamberlin may refer to:
 Joseph Conrad Chamberlin, American arachnologist
 Joseph Edgar Chamberlin, American journalist and editor
 Willard Joseph Chamberlin, known as Joe, American entomologist

See also
 Joseph Chamberlain (disambiguation)